Nootka Island is an island adjacent to Vancouver Island in British Columbia, Canada. It is separated from Vancouver Island by Nootka Sound and its side-inlets, and is located within Electoral Area A of the Strathcona Regional District.

Europeans named the island after a Nuu-chah-nulth language word meaning "go around, go around".  They likely thought the natives were referring to the island itself.  The Spanish and later English applied the word to the island and the sound, thinking they were naming both after the people.

In the 1980s, the First Nations peoples in the region created the collective autonym of Nuu-chah-nulth, a term that means "along the outside (of Vancouver Island)".  An older term for this group of peoples was "Aht", which means "people" in their language and is a component in all the names of their subgroups, and of some locations (e.g. Yuquot, Mowachaht, Kyuquot, Opitsaht etc.).

Climate

See also
Nootka Crisis
Nootka Convention
Nootka Fault, a local geologic fault.
Fort San Miguel

References

Islands of British Columbia
Nootka Sound region